Filip Kuzmanovski (born 3 July 1996) is a Macedonian handball player who plays for HSG Wetzlar and the  Macedonian national team.

He participated at the 2019 World Men's Handball Championship.

References

External links

1996 births
Living people
Macedonian male handball players
Sportspeople from Bitola
Expatriate handball players
Macedonian expatriate sportspeople in Germany
Handball-Bundesliga players
Competitors at the 2018 Mediterranean Games
Mediterranean Games competitors for North Macedonia